David Small (born February 12, 1945) is an American writer and illustrator who is best known for children's picture books. His books have been awarded a Caldecott Medal and two Caldecott Honors, among other recognition.

Biography 
David Small was born in Detroit, Michigan. He began drawing at the age of two years, and health problems that kept him home for much of his childhood, also led to his developing his drawing skills. He attended Cass Technical High School and wrote plays throughout his teenage years. 

At age 21, he switched to art. He earned a bachelor of fine arts degree at Wayne State University and a master of fine arts degree at Yale University. Small taught art for many years on the college level, ran a film series, and made satirical sketches for campus newspapers. His first book, Eulalie and the Hopping Head, which he wrote and illustrated, was published in 1981.

Small earned a 1997 Caldecott Honor and The Christopher Medal for The Gardener, with Sarah Stewart, his wife. She also received the 2007 Michigan Author Award. 

In 2001 Small won the Caldecott Medal for So You Want to Be President?, combining political cartooning with children's book illustration. He received a second Caldecott Honor in 2013 for illustrating Toni Buzzeo's One Cool Friend. Small's drawings have appeared in the New Yorker and the New York Times.  On July 15, 2014, he was announced as a finalist for the 2015 NSK Neustadt Prize for Children's Literature.

In 2020 it was announced that Western Michigan University Libraries would acquire David Small and Sarah Stewart's archives, including their original artwork, sketchbooks, journals, published and unpublished writings.

David Small and his wife Sarah Stewart make their home in an historic manor house in Mendon, Michigan.

Stitches

Small's graphic memoir, Stitches, was published in September 2009. It tells the story of Small's journey from sickly child to cancer patient, to troubled teen who ran away from home at sixteen to become an artist. Stitches was reviewed by the New York Times and the Los Angeles Times. 

It was a #1 New York Times Best Seller, and was named one of the ten best books of 2009 by Publishers Weekly and Amazon.com. It was a finalist for the 2009 National Book Award for Young People's Literature. Stitches has been translated into seven different languages and published in nine different countries.

Works

As writer and illustrator
 Eulalie and the Hopping Head (Macmillan, 1982) – named a School Library Journal Best Book of the Year
 Imogene's Antlers (Crown Publishers, 1985)
 Paper John (Farrar, Straus and Giroux [FSG], 1987)
 Ruby Mae Has Something to Say (Crown, 1992)
 Hoover's Bride (Knopf Books for Young Readers, 1995)
 Fenwick's Suit (FSG, 1996)
 George Washington's Cows (FSG, 1997)
 Stitches (W.W. Norton, 2009)
 Home After Dark (Liveright Publishing Corporation, 2018)

As illustrator with Sarah Stewart
Small has illustrated several books written by Sarah Stewart and published by Farrar, Straus and Giroux (FSG).
 The Money Tree (FSG, 1994)
 The Library (FSG, 1995)
 The Gardener (FSG, 1997) – Caldecott Honor Book
 The Journey (FSG, 2001)
 The Friend (FSG, 2004)
 The Quiet Place (FSG, 2012)
This Book Of Mine (FSG, 2019)

As illustrator with other writers
 Gulliver's Travels, Jonathan Swift (William Morrow & Co., 1983)
 The Dragon Who Lived Downstairs, Burr Tillstrom (William Morrow & Co., 1984)
 Company's Coming, written by Arthur Yorinks (Knopf, 1988)
 A Surfeit of Similes, Norton Juster (William Morrow & Co., 1989)
 Petey's Bedtime Story, Beverly Cleary (HarperCollins, 1993)
 The Christmas Crocodile, Bonnie Becker (Simon & Schuster, 1998)
 Huckabuck Family: And How They Raised Popcorn in Nebraska and Quit and Came Back, Carl Sandburg, (FSG, 1999) – one of the 1923 Rootabaga Stories, 
 So You Want to Be President?, Judith St. George (Penguin Philomel, 2000) – winner of the 2001 Caldecott Medal 
 Company's Going, Arthur Yorinks (Hyperion Books for Children, 2001)
 The Mouse and His Child, Russell Hoban (Arthur A. Levine Books, 2001)
 So You Want to Be an Inventor?, Judith St. George (Philomel, 2002)
 The Essential Worldwide Monster Guide, Linda Ashman (Simon & Schuster, 2003)
 So You Want to Be an Explorer?, Judith St. George (Philomel, 2005)
 My Senator and Me: A Dog's Eye View of Washington, D.C., Ted Kennedy (Scholastic Books, 2006)
 Once Upon a Banana, Jennifer Armstrong (Simon & Schuster, 2006)
 When Dinosaurs Came with Everything, Elise Broach (Atheneum Books for Young Readers, 2007)
 That Book Woman, Heather Henson (Atheneum, 2008)
 The Underneath, Kathi Appelt (Atheneum, 2008)
 One Cool Friend, Toni Buzzeo (Dial Books for Young Readers, 2012) – Caldecott Honor Book
 Long Road to the Circus, Betsy Bird (Knopf Books for Young Readers, 2021)

References

External links
 
 

 

1945 births
American children's book illustrators
American children's writers
Caldecott Medal winners
Writers from Detroit
Wayne State University alumni
Yale University alumni
Living people
People from Mendon, Michigan